Freaks and Geeks is an American teen comedy-drama television series created by Paul Feig and executive-produced by Judd Apatow that aired on NBC during the 1999–2000 television season. The show is set in a suburban high school near Detroit during 1980–81. The theme of Freaks and Geeks reflects "the sad, hilarious unfairness of teen life". With little success when it first aired, due to an erratic episode schedule and conflicts between the creators and NBC, the series was canceled after airing 12 out of the 18 episodes. The series became a cult classic, and Judd Apatow continued the show's legacy by incorporating the actors in future productions.

The series has appeared in numerous lists of the greatest television shows of all time, including lists by Time, Entertainment Weekly, TV Guide and Rolling Stone. It launched most of its young actors' careers, such as James Franco, Seth Rogen, Jason Segel, Busy Philipps, John Francis Daley, Martin Starr, Samm Levine and Linda Cardellini.

Plot
Teenager Lindsay Weir and her younger brother, Sam, attend William McKinley High School during the 1980–81 school year. The show is set in the town of Chippewa, Michigan, a fictional suburb of Detroit (named after Chippewa Valley High School, which series creator Paul Feig attended).

Lindsay joins a group of friends who are referred to as the "freaks" – Daniel Desario, Ken Miller, Nick Andopolis and Kim Kelly – while Sam's friends constitute the "geeks", Neal Schweiber and Bill Haverchuck. The Weir parents – Harold and Jean – are featured in every episode, and Millie Kentner, Lindsay's nerdy and highly religious former best friend, is a recurring character, as well as Cindy Sanders, the popular cheerleader on whom Sam has a crush.

Lindsay finds herself attempting to transform her life as an academically proficient student, a star "mathlete" and a young girl into a rebellious teenager who hangs out with troubled slackers. Her relationships with her new friends – and the friction they cause with her parents and with her own self-image – form one central strand of the show. The other follows Sam and his group of geeky friends as they navigate a different part of the social universe and try to fit in.

Cast and characters

Main cast
Linda Cardellini as Lindsay Weir
John Francis Daley as Sam Weir
James Franco as Daniel Desario
Samm Levine as Neal Schweiber
Seth Rogen as Ken Miller
Jason Segel as Nick Andopolis
Martin Starr as Bill Haverchuck
Becky Ann Baker as Jean Weir
Joe Flaherty as Harold Weir
Busy Philipps as Kim Kelly (credited after titles as "also starring")

Recurring cast

Guest stars and cameo appearances
Guest stars included:
Samaire Armstrong as "Deadhead" Laurie
Alexandra Breckenridge as mathlete Shelly Weaver
Jack Conley as Kim Kelly's stepfather
Kevin Corrigan as Millie's delinquent cousin
Allen Covert as a liquor store clerk
Matt Czuchry as a student from rival Lincoln High
Alexander Gould as Ronnie, the boy Lindsay babysits while high
Steve Higgins as Mr. Fleck, the Geeks' A/V teacher
Rashida Jones as Kim Kelly's friend Karen Scarfolli
Bianca Kajlich as a nose piercing punk girl
David Koechner as a waiter, in an uncredited role
David Krumholtz as Neal's brother Barry
Shia LaBeouf as Herbert, the school mascot
Leslie Mann as school teacher Miss Foote
Ben Stiller as a Secret Service agent
Jason Schwartzman as Howie Gelfand, a student dealing in fake IDs

The show's producers were resistant to stunt casting. For example, they resisted the network's suggestion that they have Britney Spears appear as a waitress in one episode; they thought such appearances would detract from the show's realism.

Several of the screenwriters appeared on the show. Mike White played Kim Kelly's oft-discussed injured brother, and first appeared in episode 4, "Kim Kelly is My Friend". Paul Feig, Gabe Sachs and series composer Michael Andrews appear uncredited as members of the fictional band Dimension in "I'm With the Band".

Numerous actors who starred on Freaks and Geeks would later appear on Judd Apatow's later TV series Undeclared, including Rogen, Segel, Levine, Starr, Phillips and Melnick, among several others.

Episodes
The script for the pilot episode of Freaks and Geeks was written by Paul Feig as a spec script. Feig gave the script to producer Judd Apatow, who sold it to DreamWorks, where Apatow was under an overall deal. DreamWorks sold it to NBC, who greenlit a pilot. Before the script was shot, Feig wrote a second episode at the behest of Apatow. He showed this second script to Apatow and pilot director Jake Kasdan, and they suggested that he combine the two episodes to form a stronger pilot. Notable additions include the introduction of Kim Kelly and Lindsay's recollection of her grandmother's death. Feig wrote a final draft after a read-through with the cast, this time incorporating a first meeting between Lindsay and the freaks (in previous drafts, Lindsay was already part of the group).

The show ran for 18 episodes, three of which – "Kim Kelly Is My Friend", "Dead Dogs and Gym Teachers" and "Noshing and Moshing" – were unaired by NBC and not seen until Fox Family ran the show in 2000. The final three episodes premiered at the Museum of Television and Radio prior to being broadcast on television. The list below is ordered by the chronology of the storyline.

*  Initial airing occurred on Fox Family.

Planned storylines
In a 2012 interview with Vanity Fair, Paul Feig detailed what would have happened to the characters if the show had continued: Lindsay would become a human rights lawyer, years after following the Grateful Dead. Sam would have joined the drama club. Neal would cope with his parents' divorce by joining a swing choir in school. Bill would join the basketball team, becoming a jock and leading to tension with the geeks. Daniel would end up in jail. Kim would become pregnant on tour while following the Grateful Dead. Nick would be pressured by his strict father to join the Army.

Media releases

DVD and Blu-ray
On April 6, 2004, a six-DVD Freaks and Geeks box set was released through Shout! Factory and Sony BMG Music Entertainment. A limited "yearbook edition" set, including two additional discs, was also available through the official website for the show. Fans who had signed an online petition to get the show on DVD got priority in purchasing the special set.

On November 25, 2008, the deluxe "Yearbook Edition" box set was re-released through Vivendi Entertainment. The set features all of the episodes, commentaries and special features of the "Complete Series" six-DVD set, plus two extra discs and deluxe packaging. It is packaged as an 80-page color yearbook with essays, pictures and episode synopses.

In July 2015, Shout! Factory announced it had begun preparing for a Blu-ray release of the series. It was subsequently confirmed in December 2015 that Shout! would release the complete series on Blu-ray on March 22, 2016, and the set would contain all special features from the previous releases and the episodes in both their original aspect ratio and widescreen.

As of July 1, 2021, all U.S. DVD and Blu-ray releases have been discontinued and are out of print.

Books
In October 2004, Newmarket Press released two Freaks and Geeks books: Freaks and Geeks: The Complete Scripts, Volume 1 and Freaks and Geeks: The Complete Scripts, Volume 2. Each book covers nine scripts from the series, compiled by Paul Feig and Judd Apatow. Extra content includes behind-the-scenes memos and notes, photos, additional plot lines and excerpts from the Freaks and Geeks series bibles.

Soundtrack

Freaks and Geeks creators made it a priority to feature genuine, period-specific music that would help to create the show's tone. Clearing such names as Billy Joel, Cheap Trick, the Grateful Dead, Rush, Styx, The Moody Blues, The Who and Van Halen required much of the show's budget. Eventually, this became an obstacle in releasing the show on DVD due to the difficulty and expense of clearing all of the music rights for the series. Music cues were changed or removed for Freaks and Geeks when it aired in reruns on Fox Family. However, Freaks and Geeks creators chose to wait to release the DVD until they could find a company willing to pay for the original music. Shout! Factory, a music and video company specializing in comprehensive reissues and compilations, eventually brought Freaks and Geeks to DVD with all of its music intact.

Appearances
In 2000, the cast of Freaks and Geeks was featured in an episode of the game show Family Feud hosted by Louie Anderson.

Reception

Critical reception
At Metacritic, Freaks and Geeks has a score of 88 out of 100, based on 26 reviews, indicating "universal acclaim". On Rotten Tomatoes, the show has a score of 100% with an average rating of 9.67 out of 10, based on 27 reviews. The site's critical consensus reads, "Freaks and Geeks lampoons real-life adolescence while affectionately embracing every growing pain along the way with refreshing honesty."

Ratings
The show averaged 6.77 million viewers and was #93 in the rankings during its only season.

Awards and nominations
The series received three Emmy Award nominations: creator Paul Feig was nominated twice for Outstanding Writing for a Comedy Series, for the episodes "Pilot" and "Discos and Dragons", and it won for Outstanding Casting for a Comedy Series (Allison Jones, Coreen Mayrs and Jill Greenberg). It was also nominated for two Television Critics Association Awards, for New Program of the Year and Outstanding Achievement in Drama. For acting, the series won for Best Family TV Series – Comedy and was nominated for Best Performance in a TV Series – Young Ensemble at the Young Artist Awards. For the YoungStar Awards, John Francis Daley and Sarah Hagan were nominated for Best Young Actor/Performance in a Comedy TV Series, and the ensemble was nominated for Best Young Ensemble Cast – Television. The series also received several other nominations in other categories.

The series appeared on Time magazine's 2007 "100 Greatest Shows of All Time" list, and placed third on the magazine's list of greatest television shows of the 2000s. In 2004 and 2007, respectively, Freaks and Geeks ranked No. 25 and No. 21 on TV Guides Top Cult Shows Ever. In 2008, Entertainment Weekly ranked it the 13th-best series of the past 25 years. The same year, AOL TV named it the Best School Show of All Time. In 2013, TV Guide included it in its list of The 60 Greatest Dramas of All Time, and ranked it No. 1 on their list of 60 shows that were "Cancelled Too Soon". In 2016, it was named the 11th-greatest television series of all time by Rolling Stone.

Cancellation and legacy
One of the cited reasons for its early cancellation was its inability to gain an audience due to its "erratic scheduling" and poor time slots, competing with the high-rated Who Wants to Be a Millionaire. The producers created a website for the series, but NBC would not share its URL because "they didn't want people to know the Internet existed; they were worried about losing viewers to it," as explained by Judd Apatow. Freaks and Geeks was only averaging under 7 million viewers, while other NBC series such as Frasier and Friends were averaging over 14 million viewers each.

NBC and the creative directors of Freaks and Geeks did not have the same vision for the series. After the network picked up the pilot, Garth Ancier replaced Scott Sassa as president of NBC Entertainment. Ancier "didn't understand public school life" and its relevance because he went to a boarding school and then on to Princeton. Creator Paul Feig expressed the "irony of the situation", as everyone involved wanted Freaks and Geeks to be a success, but the network didn't understand the concept of realistically showcasing life as ordinary teenagers. Jake Kasdan and Judd Apatow had multiple arguments with the network concerning "lack of victories" in the script and that the characters needed to be "cool." The writers wanted to produce something that would represent the average high school experience, but the network wanted to produce something that would make high school seem cool. Because the network did not think the series would be a success, they let the writers add things to the script that they "wouldn't have if they thought the show would resurface the next season", like the use of the phrase, "ambiguous genitalia". Apatow said in 2014 that "Everything I've done, in a way, is revenge for the people who cancelled Freaks and Geeks."

Undeclared
In 2001, several of the actors featured in Freaks and Geeks appeared in a new Judd Apatow college half-hour comedy Undeclared, which aired on Fox Network. Apatow fought with the network to include Freaks and Geeks actors, but the network only picked up Seth Rogen (who was already committed to the show as a writer) as a regular cast member. However, Jason Segel became a recurring character, and Samm Levine, Busy Philipps and Natasha Melnick guest-starred in multi-episode arcs, as did prominent Freaks and Geeks guest stars Steve Bannos (who played McKinley High math teacher Mr. Frank Kowchevski) and David Krumholtz (who played Neal's older brother, Barry Schweiber). Martin Starr was prominent in another episode, and a scene with Sarah Hagan was shot, although it was cut for television broadcast. The show was also canceled during its first season.

Syndication and cast reunions

In June 2010, it was announced that IFC had acquired the rights to air both Freaks and Geeks and Undeclared. Freaks and Geekss 18-episode run on IFC finished with all episodes having aired as of October 29, 2010. Undeclareds IFC run began on November 5, 2010. Both shows have also joined TeenNick's lineup as of June 13, 2011. Freaks and Geeks aired on FXX from 2013 to 2014.

A reunion of several cast members and producers of both shows took place at the Paley Center for Media's PaleyFest on March 12, 2011.

Documentary
A documentary directed by Brent Hodge chronicling the history and production of Freaks and Geeks and featuring interviews with the cast and crew, Freaks and Geeks: The Documentary, debuted at the Tribeca Film Festival on April 21, 2018. The documentary had its television debut on July 16, 2018, on A&E.

References

External links

 
 Official website – Freaks Perspective (archived)
 Official website – Geeks Perspective (archived)

Further reading
 Bowe, John (September 26, 2008). "The Trouble with Paul Feig." The New York Times.
 Koski, Genevieve (April 9, 2012). "Paul Feig walks us through Freaks And Geeks (Part 1 of 5)." The A.V. Club.
 Lloyd, Robert (December 6, 2012). "Paul Feig: What Would’ve Happened to Every Character in Freaks and Geeks’ Lost Second Season (Drugs! Pregnancies! Republicanism!)." Vanity Fair.
 Lloyd, Robert (January 2013). "2 Good 2 Be 4Gotten: An Oral History of Freaks and Geeks." Vanity Fair.

 
1999 American television series debuts
2000 American television series endings
1990s American comedy-drama television series
1990s American high school television series
1990s American teen drama television series
2000s American comedy-drama television series
2000s American high school television series
2000s American teen drama television series
Coming-of-age television shows
English-language television shows
NBC original programming
Television series about families
Television series about siblings
Television series about teenagers
Television series by Apatow Productions
Television series by DreamWorks Television
Television series set in the 1980s
Television series set in 1980
Television series set in 1981
Television shows filmed in Los Angeles
Television shows set in Detroit
Television works about intersex